La Regenta ("The [female] Regent") is a realist novel by Spanish author Leopoldo Alas y Ureña, also known as Clarín, published in 1884 and 1885.

Plot
The story is set in Vetusta (Spanish  stands for "antiquated", "extremely old", a provincial capital city, very identifiable with Oviedo, capital of Asturias – especially since it is said that two monks, Nolan and John, founded the city, this being Oviedo's mythical genesis), where the main character of the work, Ana Ozores "La Regenta", marries the former prime magistrate of the city, Víctor Quintanar, a kind but fussy man much older than she. Feeling sentimentally abandoned, Ana lets herself be courted by the province casanova, Álvaro Mesía. To complete the circle, Don Fermín de Pas (Ana's confessor and canon in the cathedral of Vetusta) also falls in love with her and becomes Mesía's unmentionable rival. A great panorama of secondary characters, portrayed by Clarín with merciless irony, completes the human landscape of the novel.

Interpretation

The author uses the city of Vetusta as a symbol of vulgarity, lack of culture and hypocrisy. On the other hand, Ana incarnates the tortured ideal that perishes progressively before a hypocritical society. With these forces in tension, the Asturian writer narrates a cruel story of Spanish provincial life in the days of the Restoration.

Adaptations

This novel has been adapted to Film and TV, written and directed by Fernando Méndez-Leite and premiered in 1995.
Also a Musical was premiered at the Campoamor Theatre, in Oviedo, hometown of La Regenta; "La Regenta El Musical" in July 2012, written and composed by Sigfrido Cecchini, with the stage direction of Emilio Sagi.

External links
 
 Full text of the novel can be found here
 https://web.archive.org/web/20110707122643/http://www.laregentaelmusical.com/
 https://web.archive.org/web/20110827065604/http://sigfridocecchini.com/Sigfrido_Cecchini.html

1885 novels
19th-century Spanish novels
Adultery in novels
Asturian culture
Oviedo
Asturias in fiction
Novels set in Spain
Spanish novels adapted into films